Okay, America! is a 1932 American Pre-Code film, about a gossip columnist's rise to fame, based closely on the real life of Walter Winchell.

Cast
 Lew Ayres as Larry Wayne
 Maureen O'Sullivan as Sheila Barton
 Louis Calhern as Mileaway Russell
 Edward Arnold as Duke Morgan
 Walter Catlett as City Editor aka 'Lucille'
 Alan Dinehart as Roger Jones
 Henry Armetta as Sam
 Emerson Treacy as Jerry Robbins
 Marjorie Gateson as Mrs. Herbert Wright
 Margaret Lindsay as Ruth Drake
 Akim Tamiroff as Bit role (uncredited)

External links
 

1932 films
1930s adventure drama films
Universal Pictures films
Films directed by Tay Garnett
Films about journalists
American adventure drama films
American black-and-white films
1930s American films